Shirwal Caves are a group of 15 Buddhist caves located in a small village called Shriwal, 48 km south of Pune, India. 

One is Chaitya and 14 Caves represent Vihara. All caves are plain belonging to the early phase of Buddhism.

References

Buddhist caves in India
Caves of Maharashtra
Indian rock-cut architecture
Former populated places in India
Buddhist pilgrimage sites in India
Buddhist monasteries in India
Buddhist temples in India
Caves containing pictograms in India